AEC may refer to:

Organizations
 Catalan Space Agency (Agència Espacial de Catalunya)
 Ars Electronica Center, Linz, Austria
 Art Ensemble of Chicago, US

Governance
 African Economic Community
 African Energy Chamber
 Alaska Engineering Commission
 ASEAN Economic Community
 Assessment and Evaluation Commission, a peace agreement monitoring commission in Sudan
 Assets Examination Committee, a military-appointed committee in Thailand
 Atomic Energy Commission (disambiguation), of various countries, especially:
 United States Atomic Energy Commission
 Australian Electoral Commission

Business
 Aero Engine Controls, a Rolls-Royce plc company
 AEC (Alashki Engineering Constructions), Bulgarian structural and civil engineering company
 Aluminum Extruders Council, a US trade association
 Anger Engineering Company, in Milwaukee, Wisconsin, US, from 1913 to 1915
 Architecture, Engineering, & Construction, a collective term for 3 associated industries; e.g. Industry Foundation Classes
 Sometimes also Facility Management (Operations) is added, and this is called "AECO"
 Arctic Economic Council
 Associated Equipment Company, a former British bus and lorry manufacturer
 Astro AEC, a Malaysia TV channel
 Automotive Electronics Council, a US qualification standard organization
 Advanced Electronics Company, Riyadh, Saudi Arabia

Education
 Army Educational Corps, later the Royal Army Educational Corps
 Asansol Engineering College, in West Bengal, India
 Assam Engineering College, in Guwahati city, India
 European Association of Conservatoires, the main association of colleges and university schools of music in Europe

Science and technology
 3-amino-9-ethylcarbazole, an immunohistochemistry stain (chromogen)
 Abstract elementary class, in mathematical logic
 Acoustic echo cancellation, in telephony
 Automatic exposure control, in radiography
 Anion exchange capacity, in pedology (soil sciences)

Sports
 America East Conference, an NCAA Division I athletic conference
 Atlantic East Conference, an NCAA Division III athletic conference

Other uses
 Acoustic Echo Cancellation
 Actually existing capitalism
 Angeles Electric Corporation
 AEC Armoured Command Vehicle, a series of command vehicles built by the British Associated Equipment Company during the Second World War .
 Anti-Eviction Campaign, a South African social movement
 Attestation of College Studies, a college certificate in the Quebec, Canada
 Sa'idi Arabic (ISO 639-3 code)